WLLB-LD, virtual channel 15 (VHF digital channel 6), was a low-powered Daystar owned-and-operated television station licensed to Portland, Maine, United States. The station was by the Word of God Fellowship, Daystar's broadcast license division. WoG surrendered WLLB-LD's license to the Federal Communications Commission on September 30, 2022, who cancelled it the same day.

External links 

Low-power television stations in the United States
LLB-LD
Mass media in Portland, Maine
Daystar (TV network) affiliates
Television channels and stations established in 1992
1992 establishments in Maine
Defunct television stations in the United States
Television channels and stations disestablished in 2022
2022 disestablishments in Maine